The Minister of State for Social Care is a mid-level position in the Department of Health and Social Care in the British government. It is held by Helen Whately MP who took office on 26 October 2022. The minister often deputises for the Secretary of State for Health and Social Care alongside the Minister of State for Health and Secondary Care. The minister is in charge of social care in England.

History 
The position was created in 2006, with Ivan Lewis being made Minister of State for Care Services.

After the Conservative victory in the 2015 United Kingdom general election Alistair Burt returned to Government as Minister of State for Care and Support in the Department of Health. In July 2016, Burt announced that he would be resigning from his Ministerial position, "Twenty-four years and one month ago, I answered my first question as a junior minister in oral questions and I’ve just completed my last oral questions," Burt said. It was made clear that his resignation was not related to Brexit.

The position was given to David Mowat and renamed as Parliamentary Under-Secretary of State for Care and Support. David Mowat lost his Warrington South seat in the snap 2017 general election. He was not replaced until 2018 when Prime Minister Theresa May appointed Caroline Dinenage as the new Minister of Care. Dinenage stayed in her role when Boris Johnson became Prime Minister and served in the First Johnson ministry and into the Second Johnson ministry.

As part of the 2020 British cabinet reshuffle, a number of junior ministers were moved around. Dinenage was made the new Minister of State for Digital and Culture. Helen Whately was her replacement. Helen Whatley has been in charge of government response to social care during the COVID-19 pandemic in the United Kingdom, particularly in reference to vaccination deployment.

Responsibilities 
The Minister of State for Social Care leads on the following:

 adult social care:
 winter planning for adult social care
 funding and markets (charging reform)
 quality (system reform)
 workforce
 integration, including discharge
 community health services
 major diseases:
 cancer
 diabetes
 strokes
 rare diseases
 screening
 dementia
 end-of-life care
 COVID-19 vaccine licensing
 long-term conditions

Minister of State for Social Care

References

See also 

 Health minister

Health ministers of the United Kingdom
Social care in England
Social care in England and Wales
Department of Health and Social Care
Health in the United Kingdom
COVID-19 pandemic in the United Kingdom
Patient safety